Luis Cedeño (born August 11, 1961), more commonly known as DJ Disco Wiz  is an American DJ. He is noted as being the first Latino DJ in Hip-Hop.

Old School 
He was born in the Bronx, New York City, United States, to a Puerto Rican father and a mother from Cuba

After being inspired at a Kool Herc jam by the emerging hip hop movement taking place in The Bronx, DJ Disco Wiz collaborated with his best friend, Casanova Fly (Grandmaster Caz), to form a group called the Mighty Force crew. Mighty Force is noted as being one of the first Hip-Hop DJ crews in the mid-to-late 1970s. Noted for their DJ battles in the streets of the South Bronx, the Mighty Force crew was also responsible for presenting the first Latino rapper to the world, Prince Whipper Whip, who is also of Puerto Rican descent. DJ Disco Wiz is also credited for being the first DJ to create a "mixed plate" in 1977 (Hip-Hop's first mixed dub recording) when he and Grandmaster Caz, combined sound bites, special effects and paused beats.

New School
The grandson of the late Puerto Rican artist and Santero Norberto Cedeño; (La Mano Poderosa, 1950), Wiz is the creator of "The Hip-Hop Meets Spoken Wordz" series, a hip hop and poetry performance series that gives a voice to up-and-coming Latino talent in New York City. As a poet, DJ Disco Wiz has performed at the Apollo Theater and the landmark Nuyorican Poets Cafe and his poetry can be seen in the upcoming book Born in the Bronx. Wiz also appears in a few documentaries on hip-hop history including 1 LOVE, a film produced by noted hip-hop historian James "Koe" Rodriguez about the lives of Joe Conzo, Ernie Paniccioli, and Jamel Shabazz—hip-hop's first photographers.

Wiz has openly contributed to the community education of the formative years of hip-hop. In the millennium issue of The Source Magazine he candidly shared his experience in being the first Latino during the culture's evolution. He was also a major contributor in the opening of the Experience Music Project in Seattle, Washington in 2000. His contribution and donation of original hip-hop flyers, solely for the preservation of hip-hop can be seen as part of the archives. He was also instrumental in the making of Jim Fricke and Charlie Ahearn's rendition of the early years of hip-hop entitled Yes, Yes Y’all; sharing numerous original flyers and first-hand accounts of the early years of hip-hop including an account of the historical New York City blackout of 1977.

He is also a board member of the Universal Federation for the Preservation of Hip Hop Culture, chaired by Afrika Bambaataa of the Universal Zulu Nation. The Federation also includes on its board; Grandmaster Caz, DJ Tony Tone, Kurtis Blow, GrandMaster Melle Mel, KRS-One, Lovebug Starski, Jorge “PopMaster Fabel” Pabon, and photographer Joe Conzo.

Wiz co-authored his memoirs with Simon & Schuster author Ivan Sanchez. The book is titled It’s Just Begun: The Epic Journey of DJ Disco Wiz, Hip-Hop’s First Latino DJ. The book was released on the Miss Rosen imprint of powerHouse Books in 2009.

Further reading 

It's Just Begun: The Epic Journey of DJ Disco Wiz, Hip Hop's First Latino DJ By Ivan Sanchez and Luis "DJ Disco Wiz" Cedeño, Miss Rosen Editions, (2009) Powerhouse Books 
 Yes Yes Y'All: Oral History of Hip Hop's First Decade. Fricke, Jim and Charlie Ahearn (eds). Experience Music Project. Perseus Books Group. 
 Born in the Bronx: A Visual Record of the Early Days of Hip Hop. Joe Conzo, Johan Kugelberg, Afrika Bambaataa, Buddy Esquire and Jeff Change. (2007) - Rizzoli International Publications, Inc. 
 Freedom of Expression: Overzealous Copyright Bozos and Other Enemies of Creativity. Kembrew McLeod (2005) - Doubleday 
 Hip Hop Decoded. The Black Dot (2005) - MOME Publishing Inc. 
 Turn the Beat Around: The Secret History of Disco. Peter Shapiro (2005) - Faber & Faber 
 Rap Music and Street Consciousness (Music in American Life). Cheryl L. Keyes (2004) - University of Illinois Press 
 Rap Whoz Who. Steven Stancel (1996) - Schrirmer Books
 U.net, Bigger than hip hop 2006, Agenzia X, Cox 18 Books,

Television 
 The Emmy Nominated Vh1 Rock Doc ny77: the Coolest year in hell Developed by Nanette Burstein and Firehouse Films for Vh1.

References

External links

1961 births
American people of Cuban descent
American people of Puerto Rican descent
American hip hop DJs
Living people
Musicians from New York City
Musicians from the Bronx
East Coast hip hop musicians